The Three Lascars is a 2021 Burkinabé comedy film directed by Boubacar Diallo. It was the only Burkinabé film screened at the 2021 FESPACO.

Synopsis 
Under pressure from their respective mistresses, three friends (Idriss, Momo and Willy) organize an extramarital trip to an extravagant hotel outside of Ouagadougou. A seminar in Abidjan is the perfect alibi for the trio to free themselves from their wives for a weekend. As soon as they arrive, their euphoria subsides when they learn that the plane they were supposed to have taken has crashed. Ridden with shame and guilt and abandoned by their mistresses, the three adulterers wallow in depression. In the end, they will have to face their wives, hungry for revenge after the deception.

Cast 

 Issaka Savadogo
 Mahoula Kane
 Dieudonné Yoda
 Zena Alisar Khalil
 Eva Guehi
 Irène Minoungou
 Kadhy Touré
 Mouna N’Diaye
 Mariam Aida Niatta

References

External links 
 

Burkinabé comedy films
2020s French-language films
2021 films
2021 comedy films